The 2024 United States House of Representatives elections in Maine will be held on November 5, 2024, to elect both U.S. representatives from the State of Maine, one from each of the state's congressional districts. The elections will coincide with the 2024 U.S. presidential election, as well as other elections to the House of Representatives, elections to the United States Senate, and various state and local elections.

District 1

The incumbent is Democrat Chellie Pingree, who was re-elected with 62.8% of the vote in 2022.

Democratic primary

Candidates

Potential
Chellie Pingree, incumbent U.S. Representative

General election

Predictions

District 2

The incumbent is Democrat Jared Golden, who was re-elected with 53.1% of the vote in 2022.

Democratic primary

Candidates

Potential
Jared Golden, incumbent U.S. Representative

Republican primary

Candidates

Potential
Trey Stewart, Minority Leader of the Maine Senate and candidate in 2022

Declined
Jason Levesque, Mayor of Auburn and nominee for this district in 2010

General election

Predictions

References

2024
Maine
United States House of Representatives